Brian Andrew Murphy (born 1 December 1976) is a Rhodesian-born former Zimbabwean cricketer and a former captain of limited over cricket for Zimbabwe. He played his cricket for Mashonaland in Zimbabwe and Western Province in South Africa. He played a total of 11 Test matches and 31 One Day Internationals for Zimbabwe, and was the surprise choice as captain when Heath Streak stepped down in 2001. However, after four ODIs and one Test he sustained a hand injury and relinquished the captaincy, which was then awarded to Stuart Carlisle.

Murphy returned to international cricket after recovering from injury, playing in the 2003 Cricket World Cup before quitting Zimbabwe for England where he was offered a contract to play club cricket. He also took a job, coaching at the University of Cape Town in South Africa.

References

 http://crictime.city
 http://www.brmtaylor.com/news-142.html
 Cricinfo page on Brian Murphy

1976 births
Living people
Rhodesian people
Cricketers from Harare
Mashonaland cricketers
Western Province cricketers
Zimbabwean expatriates in England
Zimbabwean expatriates in South Africa
Zimbabwean ODI captains
Zimbabwe One Day International cricketers
Zimbabwe Test cricket captains
Zimbabwe Test cricketers
Zimbabwean Under-19 ODI captains
Zimbabwean Under-19 Test captains
Zimbabwean cricketers
Cricketers at the 2003 Cricket World Cup
People from Swardeston
White Zimbabwean sportspeople